Maria Andersson Willner (born 1978) is a Swedish Social Democratic Party politician.

She was elected member of the Riksdag for the period 2014–2018 from the Västra Götaland County South constituency.

References

1978 births
Living people
Members of the Riksdag from the Social Democrats
Women members of the Riksdag
Members of the Riksdag 2014–2018
21st-century Swedish women politicians